33 Engineer Regiment (EOD&S) is a regiment of the British Army's Royal Engineers. It is based at Carver Barracks, Essex.

Organization 
Today the regiment consists of:

 33 Engineer Regiment (EOD&S), in Wimbish
 Regimental HQ and HQ Troop
49 Explosive Ordnance Disposal and Search Squadron (reformed 2018)
58 Explosive Ordnance Disposal Field Squadron
217 (London) EOD Field Squadron in Ilford and Prittlewell
350 (Sherwood Foresters) EOD Field Squadron in Chilwell and at Wallis Barracks
821 Explosive Ordnance Disposal Field Squadron
x2 Commando Troops (supporting HQ 3 Cdo Bgd)
x2 Troops (supporting HQ 16 AA Bgd)
Explosive Ordnance Clearance Group

References

External links

Regiments of the Royal Engineers